Di Masi is a surname. Notable people with the surname include: 

 Francesco De Masi (1930–2005), Italian conductor and film score composer
 Giuseppe Adriano Di Masi (born 1981), Italian footballer